Jir Gavaber (also Romanized as Jīr Gavāber, Jīrgavābar, and Jīrgovāber) is a village in Shabkhus Lat Rural District, Rankuh District, Amlash County, Gilan Province, Iran. At the 2006 census, its population was 821, in 230 families.

References 

Populated places in Amlash County